NK Nedelišće is a Croatian football club based in Nedelišće in Međimurje, currently playing in Croatian Fourth League - Četvrta nogometna liga Čakovec-Varaždin.

External links
Official website 

Football clubs in Croatia
Football clubs in Međimurje County
Association football clubs established in 1946
1946 establishments in Croatia